The University of Pedagogical Sciences "Hector Alfredo Pineda Zaldivar" (UCPETP), originally named "Héctor Alfredo Pineda Zaldívar Higher Pedagogical Institute" (ISPETP) is a Higher Education, post-graduate and doctoral research university located in Boyeros, Havana, Cuba. It has the mission to prepare professors capable of developing high level professionals in different areas of engineering. It works to become the national leader of scientific and technical-pedagogical excellence for the improvement of the Technical and Professional Education and for its leading role of the technical careers in the rest of the pedagogical institutions.

History

The creation of the university has its origin in a project of the United Nations Educational, Scientific and Cultural Organization (UNESCO) requested by Cuban Government. It was originally named Higher Technical Pedagogical Institute of Technical Education (ISPET) and it was installed in the Center of Students of Agricultural Sciences (CEDCA), in the municipality of Boyeros. This project was included in the United Nations Development Program (PNUD) with the specification CUB 71-511. It began in the 1972-1973 academic year with an emerging training course. It is officially created in the course 1973-1974.

In the academic year 1976-1977 with the network of Pedagogical Institutes of the MINED, the center becomes the ISPETP and works with the Faculties of: Technology, Agricultural Sciences and Economic Sciences. The licentiate degree of all the specialties was imparted in the present Superior School of Management of the Industry Ministry and in some places of the Polytechnic "José Martí".

In 1979 the Faculty of Mechanics was approved. From 1986 the ISPETP was made with students graduated from the related specialties and is assigned the name of Héctor Alfredo Pineda Zaldívar, outstanding educator of the center that lost his life in the fulfillment of his professional duty.

In 1987, the creation of the Center's Scientific Council was approved. In 1991 arises the Center of Studies for Technical and Professional Pedagogy (CEPROF). From 1992-1993 the faculties merged in:

 Industrial Faculty.
 Faculty of Agricultural and Economic Sciences.

Due to the economic difficulties, faculties were created in Pedagogical Institutes in the rest of the country and the students were transferred to each of their provinces of origin.

The Institute now leads the Technical Education in the country, being responsible for the work of scientific and methodological advice. Today the institution carries out an intense academic work that extends in and out of our geographical borders, forming and training hundreds of professionals of the teaching in Professional Pedagogy.

Organization

At present, the faculties are arranged as follows:

 Faculty of Mechanical Engineering
 Faculty of Electrical Engineering
 Faculty of Accounting
 Faculty of Agricultural Engineering
 Faculty of Computer Sciences
 Faculty of Civil Engineering

Names and confusion 
This University of Pedagogical Sciences is named after one of its professors: Héctor Alfredo Pineda Zaldívar, who fell in unequal combat in the Zumbe region, in the People's Republic of Angola where he collaborated as a teacher. The person after whom ISPETP is named is unknown to the outside world.

It was originally named Higher Technical Pedagogical Institute of Technical Education (ISPET). In the academic year 1976-1977 the name changed to Instituto Superior Pedagogico para la Ensenanza Tecnica y Profesional "Hector Pineda Zaldivar" (ISPETP) to reflect the evolution from Technical to Technical and Professional education.

Sometimes, ISPETP is written as University of Pedagogical Sciences in some English literature, such as journals, etc. It is still known as ISPETP, due to the popularity and easy pronunciation of that short name.

UPC International Services 

 Advising on technical aspects of the Pedagogical Process
 Masters in Professional Education
 Graduates
 Training
 Postgraduate courses
 Assistance in scientific research
 Scientific and educational events.

Countries maintaining working relationships with the CPU 
 Brazil
 Ecuador
 Bolivia
 Colombia
 Mexico
 Dominican Republic
 Belize
 Mozambique
 France

Notable alumni
Conrado Cogle "Bonko Qiñongo" (graduated engineer) Comedian
Geonel Martin "Gustavito" (graduated engineer) Comedian
ALEXANDER ORTIZ OCAÑA. Ph. D. en Educación (Doctor en Ciencias Pedagógicas)
RAMZI HABER CUZAN Especialista de Transporte Aéreo Instituto de Aeronaútica Civil de Cuba (graduated Accounting)
Esteban Machado Diaz (graduated engineer) Great in the cuban Plastic Art

See also 

Education in Cuba
Havana
List of universities in Cuba

External links 

   

Universities in Cuba
Education in Havana
Culture in Havana
Educational institutions established in 1964
1964 establishments in Cuba